Longetia is a genus of plants under the family Picrodendraceae first described as a genus in 1866. It has only one known species, Longetia buxoides, endemic to New Caledonia.

formerly included
moved to other genera: Austrobuxus Scagea

See also
Taxonomy of the Picrodendraceae

References

Picrodendraceae
Monotypic Malpighiales genera
Endemic flora of New Caledonia
Taxa named by Henri Ernest Baillon